Luis de Velasco Rami  (born 1939 in Valencia) is a Spanish economist, essayist and politician. A former deputy and Secretary of State of Commerce with the Spanish Socialist Workers' Party (PSOE), he is now affiliated to and a member of the Directive Council of Union, Progress and Democracy (UPyD).

Biography 

Born in Valencia in 1939, he lived there until 1961, when he got a degree in law at the University of Valencia. Thereafter, he lived in London and Dublin for two years, and in 1964 he passed the civil service exams and entered the Ministry of Commerce. At the same time, he got a degree in economics.

Between 1967 and 1973 he lived in Chile, working in the Office of Commerce of Spain in the country. After that, in 1976 he returned to Spain, and he joined the PSOE. He was a deputy in the Congress from 1986 to 1989, representing Navarre and Secretary of State of Commerce, but in 1994 he quit the party on ideological grounds.

He was a member of the 9th Madrid Assembly. He was the UPyD candidate for the presidency of the region of Madrid. He got more than 6% of the vote, finishing fourth, and entering the Madrid Assembly with 8 deputies.

Books
 “Políticas del PSOE 1982-1995. Del “cambio” a la decepción” (1996)
 “La democracia plana” (1999) (en colaboración con José Antonio Gimbernat)
 “No son sólo algunas manzanas podridas. Sobre las causas últimas de la crisis financiera en EEUU” (2010)

References

External links 
Blog personal
 Biografía de Luis de Velasco

1939 births
People from Valencia
Spanish economists
Spanish Socialist Workers' Party politicians
Living people
Members of the UPyD Parliamentary Group (Assembly of Madrid)
Members of the 3rd Congress of Deputies (Spain)
Members of the 9th Assembly of Madrid